This is the discography for the American rock band L7.

L7 was originally formed in 1985 by Donita Sparks vocals/guitar and Suzi Gardner vocals/guitar. The band's early lineup consisted of bassist Jennifer Finch and drummer Roy Koutsky. After their debut album, the band recruited Demetra Plakas as their permanent drummer. This lineup continued through their albums Smell the Magic (1990), released on Subpop records, and Bricks Are Heavy (1992) and Hungry for Stink (1994), both released on Slash.  In 1996, Finch elected to leave the band to attend college and Greta Brink replaced her as the bass player for The Beauty Process: Triple Platinum, the third and final album released through Slash, in 1997. Gail Greenwood took over on bass for the album Slap-Happy (1999), which was produced by L7's own company, Wax Tadpole Records. After this, there were further changes to the lineup when Greenwood left the band, to be replaced by Janis Tanaka on bass. The group announced it was on an indefinite hiatus in 2001.

L7 reunited in 2014, including Jennifer Finch. The following year, they performed in Europe and North America.  The reception was positive and the band continued to tour in 2016 and 2017. In 2016, a Kickstarter-funded documentary film, titled L7: Pretend We're Dead, directed by Sarah Price, was screened at film festivals and later released in the US and abroad.

In September 2017, the band issued the single "Dispatch from Mar-a-Lago", their first new song in eighteen years.  This song was closely followed by the single "I Came Back to Bitch" in 2018. On May 3, 2019, L7's full-length album Scatter the Rats was released to generally favorable reviews.

Albums

Studio albums

Compilation albums

Live albums

Singles

Videos

 1990 – "Just Like Me" (from Smell the Magic)
 1991 – "Fast and Frightening" (from Smell the Magic)
 1992 – "Pretend We're Dead" (from Bricks are Heavy)
 1992 – "Everglade" (from Bricks are Heavy)
 1992 – "Monster" (from Bricks are Heavy)
 1994 – "Andres" (from Hungry for Stink)
 1994 – "Stuck Here Again" (from Hungry for Stink)
 1999 – L7: The Beauty Process – documentary about the band by Krist Novoselic
 2016 – L7: Pretend We're Dead (single)
 2018 – "I Came Back to Bitch" (single)
 2019 – "Burn Baby"(from Scatter the Rats)
 2019 – "Stadium West" (from Scatter the Rats)

Other appearances

Compilation appearances

References

External links
 

Discography
Punk rock discographies
Discographies of American artists
Alternative rock discographies